Devanancheri is a village in the Kumbakonam taluk of Thanjavur district, Tamil Nadu. It is located 42 km north of the district headquarters in Thanjavur, 8 km from Kumbakonam, and 286 km from the state capital, Chennai. The local language is Tamil.

Geography 
Devanancheri is located 42 km north of the district headquarters in Thanjavur, 8 km from Kumbakonam, and 286 km from the state capital, Chennai. The neighboring villages are Athiyur (2 km), Neerathanallur (2 km), Thirunallur (1 km), Inaipriyalvattam (1 km), Kadichambadi (3 km), and Cholapuram (4 km). Devanancheri is surrounded by Thiruppanandal Taluk and Tiruvidaimarudur Taluk towards the east, and Kumbakonam Taluk and Valangaiman Taluk towards the south. It is also on the border with the district of Ariyalur (39 km). Devanancheri's postal code is 612501 and the postal head office is at Koranattukkaruppur.

Population 
As per the 2001 census, Devanancheri had a total population of 2737 with 1376 males and 1361 females. The sex ratio was 989. The literacy rate was 68.07. It comes under the Kumbakonam legislative assembly constituency and the Mayiladuthurai parliamentary constituency.

Agriculture 
The village people's revenue is dependent on agriculture. The River Manniyaru provides water for the agriculture and pumped irrigation is also available. The major crops cultivated in Devanancheri are paddy, pulses, gingelly, groundnut and sugarcane. Maize, soybeans, and redgram are also grown.

Education 
Aided Middle School
Minerva Primary and Higher Secondary School
Annai College Of Arts & Science
Skss Arts College
Mass College Of Arts & Science
 Arasu Engineering College &government higher secondary school

Temples 
The Vinayagar, Sivan,pachai amman,kaliyamman,mariyamman, Thiraupathi Amman, Anjaneyar and Ayyanar temples are famous. Each year festivals are held in the temples.

Transportation 
The Kumbakonam railway station is the nearest railway to Devanancheri.  The main bus terminal is in Kumbakonam, and provides for inner and outer area transportation. Devanacheri is on a main route to Chennai. There are airports in Thanjavur and Trichy

See also
 Athiyur

References 
 
Athiyur

Villages in Thanjavur district